John Andrew Keith (August 31, 1958 – August 7, 1999) was an American author and games developer.

Career 
J. Andrew Keith, and his brother William H. Keith Jr., responded to ads in Journal of the Travellers Aid Society for authors to write for Game Designers' Workshop (GDW); Loren Wiseman started them with freelancing for GDW in the late 1970s and the three of them set up much of the early material for Traveller. J. Andrew Keith's wrote so much for the Journal of the Travellers Aid Society that he began to use the pseudonyms John Marshal and Keith Douglass. The Keith brothers were making enough money that they were able to freelance full-time by 1979. The Keith brothers then began working for FASA by the end of 1980. FASA began publishing adventures for Traveller beginning with Ordeal by Eshaar (1981) by the Keith brothers, who then wrote the "Sky Raiders" trilogy (1981-1982) for FASA. J. Andrew Keith briefly edited the magazine High Passage in 1982 before the High Passage Group told FASA that they could no longer publish material for High Passage; FASA replaced this magazine with a new magazine by J. Andrew Keith called Far Traveller beginning in October 1982. FASA ended its support of Traveller in 1983, so the Keith brothers continued writing Traveller material with the new company Gamelords, but continued working for FASA on other games. The Keith brothers wrote seven supplements for Gamelords, including The Mountain Environment (1983), The Undersea Environment (1983), and The Desert Environment (1984).

J. Andrew Keith wrote some adventures for Fantasy Games Unlimited's Chivalry & Sorcery before the line ended in 1984. The Keith brothers then worked on some of FGU's other lines in 1985 including Aftermath!, Daredevils, Flashing Blades, and Psi World. The Keith brothers also designed Freedom Fighters (1986), one of the last role-playing games published by FGU.

Works 

Andrew was a rather prolific Science Fiction and Role-Playing Game author, and the bibliography presented below is in no way comprehensive. Several of these works were with various co-authors, most commonly his brother, William H. Keith Jr.

 A note regarding pen names in the words of William H. Keith Jr.:
"We shared several [pen names]: Keith William Andrews, Keith Douglass, and H. Jay Riker. Back in the Traveller days, when he was doing a ton of writing for the old Journal of the Traveller's Aid Society, he used several pen names, including Keith Douglass and John Marshall, so it wouldn't look like the journal was entirely an Andrew Keith production."

Science fiction novels
 Wing Commander: False Colors 
 Wing Commander: Heart of the Tiger
 The Fifth Foreign Legion: March or Die
 The Fifth Foreign Legion: Honor and Fidelity
 The Fifth Foreign Legion: Cohort of the Damned
 Battletech: Blood of Heroes
 Battletech: Mercenary's Star

Science fiction short stories
 The Legacy of Leonidas
 Rendezvous with Death
 Orion Rising

Traveller RPG material
Books, Supplements, and Folio Adventures: Cargonaut Press, Digest Group Publications, FASA, Gamelords, GDW, Marischal Adventures, and Seeker.

 Escape
 Letter of Marque
 Faldor: World of Adventure
 Rogues in Space: Letter of Marque
 Rogues in Space: Scam
 Starport Planetfall

GDW
 Traveller Adventure
Alien Module 1 Aslan (1984)
Alien Module 2 K'kree (1984)
Alien Module 3 Vargr (1984)
Alien Module 4-Zhodani (1985)
Alien Module 5 Droyne (1985)
Alien Module 7-Hivers (1986)
 BeltStrike: Riches and Danger in the Bowman Belt
 Alien Realms
 Aliens for Traveller
 Arctic Environment
 Chamax Plague
 Horde
 Night of Conquest
 Merchant Prince: Special Supplement 1
 Exotic Atmospheres: Special Supplement 2
 Nomads of the World Ocean
 Murder on Arcturus Station
 Travellers' Aid Society Alien Encyclopedia
 World Builder's Handbook

Gamelords
 The Mountain Environment (1983)
 The Drenslaar Quest (1983)
 The Undersea Environment (1983)
 Ascent To Anekthor (1984)
 Startown Liberty (1984)
 The Desert Environment (1984)
 Duneraiders (1984)
 A Pilot's Guide to the Drexilthar Subsector (1984)
 Wanted: Adventurers (1984) under the pen name, John Marshal

FASA
 The Trail of the Sky Raiders
 The Legend of the Sky Raiders
 Fate of the Sky Raiders
 Harrensa Project
 Stazlekh Report, The
 Uragyad'n of the Seven Pillars

Marischal Adventures
 Flight of the Stag
 Salvage Mission
 Trading Team

Digest Group Publications
 Grand Census
 Grand Survey

Magazine articles

 Adventures in Traveller: Exploration
 Adventures in Traveller: Trade and Commerce
 Adventures in Traveller: Wilderness Situations
 Adventurette: Jailbreak
 Adventurette: Night Rescue
 Adventurette: The Last Bastion
 Adventurette: Trial By Justice
 Amber Zone: Drannixa Gambit
 Amber Zone: Embassy in Arms
 Amber Zone: Lockbox
 Amber Zone: Raid on Stataorlai
 Amber Zone: Royal Hunt
 Amber Zone: Small Package
 Amber Zone: The Birthday Plot
 Amber Zone: Tournament
 Amber Zone: Tuktaar Connection
 Amber Zone Ventures Afar
 Amber Zone: Without a Trace
 Awaiting Shipment: Petrochemicals
 Azun
 Bestiary: Afeahyaltow
 Bestiary: Crested Jabberwock
 Bestiary: Doyle's Eel
 Bestiary: Garhawk
 Bestiary: Ice Crawler
 Bestiary: Luugir
 Boarding Pass: Jalas Glennol
 Caledon Highlanders
 Care and Feeding of NPCs
 Casual Encounter: Emil "Boomer" Brankovich
 Casual Encounter: Enli Iddukagan
 Casual Encounter: Fast "Johnny" McRae
 Casual Encounter: Gamaagin Kaashukiin
 Casual Encounter: Glorinna Firella
 Casual Encounter: Gunnar Haelvedssen
 Casual Encounter: Ramon San Yarvo
 Casual Encounter: Ringaal DeAstera
 Casual Encounter: Simone Garibaldi
 Civilian Striker Weapons
 Closest Encounter
 Compleat Starport
 Computer Implants
 Computer Software for High Guard
 Contact: Ael Yael
 Contact: Aslan
 Contact: The Girug'kagh
 Contact: Irklan
 Contact: The Girug'kagh
 Contact: The Virushi
 Dev Landrel
 Flare Star
 Hunting Bugs
 I'm a Doctor, Not a. . .
 In Transit: Grav Mining Vehicle
 In Transit: Orbital Tug
 Newcomers, The
 Outside the Expanses: Reaver's Deep
 Parachutes
 Periastron
 Pilot's Guide to Ea Subsector
 Pilot's Guide to the Caledon Subsector, A
 Pilot's Guide to the Scotian Deep Subsector
 Planetfall: Supplementary Material for MegaTraveller
 Port Authority Handbook: Arrival In-System
 Port Authority Handbook: Communications
 Port Authority Handbook: Convoys
 Port Authority Handbook: Interdicted Planets
 Port Authority Handbook: Inward Clearance
 Port of Call: Rejhappur
 Port of Call: Roakhoi
 Reavers' Deep Sector
 Referee's Guide to Planet-building, Parts I and II
 Religion in the Two Thousand Worlds
 Ship's Locker: Flares and Signalling Devices
 Ship's Locker: Torches and Welding Equipment
 Ship's Locker: Vargr Corsair Bands
 Small Cargoes and Special Handling
 Small Cargoes: Three for the Road
 Small Cargoes: Afeahyakhtow
 Small Cargoes: Hkyadwaeh
 Storm
 Striking it Rich
 Temperature in Traveller
 Traveller: The Final Frontier
 Traveller's Gear: Body Pressure Suit
 Travelling Without a Starship
 Umpire Strikes Back!, The
 Vargr Grav Platforms
 Vland!
 Wardn
 Wardn Enigma
 World's of the Imperium: Fisher's World
 appeared in Challenge, Far and Away, Far Traveller, High Passage, Journal of the Travellers' Aid Society, MegaTraveller Journal, Space Gamer, Traveller Chronicle, and Travellers' Digest.

Miscellaneous Traveller Credits: FASA, and Seeker
 Adventure Class Ships I - Booklet II
 Adventure Class Ships II - Booklet I & II
 Aslan Mercenary Ships - Booklet I & II
 I.S.C.V. Leander - Booklet (scenarios: The Hostage, Terminal Velocity, and Raider!)
 I.S.P.M.V. Fenris - Booklet (scenarios: Boring From Within, Prisoners at Large, and Surprise Reversed)
 I.S.P.M.V. Tethys - Booklet (scenarios: Enemy Action, Staff Meeting, and Retreat from Stiara)
 Merchant Class Ships - Booklet I & II
 Starport Module I: Hotel Complex - Booklet (scenarios: Break-In, The Gamblers, and Hostages)
 Z.I.S.M.V. Vlezhdatl - Booklet (scenarios: Boarding Action, Prize Crew, and Escape)

References

External links 
Brother William H. Keith's web site: WHKeith.Com – William H. Keith
J. Andrew Keith Memorial web page: John Andrew Keith Memorial Site

1958 births
1999 deaths
20th-century American male writers
20th-century American novelists
American male novelists
American science fiction writers
Role-playing game designers